John Hein may refer to:

 John Hein (editor), publisher and former editor of ScotsGay
 John Hein (wrestler) (1886–1963), American wrestler

See also
 Jon Hein, American radio personality and former webmaster